Ban Bang Krathum is a town in the Bang Krathum Subdistrict of Bang Krathum District of Phitsanulok Province, Thailand.

Etymology
The first element ban (Thai:  บ้าน) means village.

The second element bang (Thai:  บาง) means village or settlement.  The third element krathum (Thai:  กระทุ่ม) means bur-flower tree (Anthocephalus chinensis).

Geography
Ban Bang Krathum is situated in the Nan Basin, which is part of the Chao Phraya Watershed.

Temples
Ban Bang Krathum is home to the following two Theravada Buddhist temples:
Wat Bang Krathum (located downtown)
Wat Huay Gaew (Thai: วัดห้วยแก้ว, Crystal Stream Temple)

References

Populated places in Phitsanulok province